Sitar (also Romanized as Sītār and Saitār; also known as Sītār-e ‘Olyā and Sītār-e ‘Omar) is a village in Sand-e Mir Suiyan Rural District, Dashtiari District, Chabahar County, Sistan and Baluchestan Province, Iran. At the 2006 census, its population was 313, in 66 families.

References 

Populated places in Dashtiari County